The Journal of Experimental & Clinical Cancer Research is a quarterly peer-reviewed open-access medical journal covering cancer research. It was established in 1982 and has been published by BioMed Central since 2008. It is the official journal of the Regina Elena National Cancer Institute. The editor-in-chief is Mauro Castelli (Regina Elena National Cancer Institute). According to the Journal Citation Reports, the journal has a 2021 impact factor of 12.658.

References

External links

Oncology journals
Quarterly journals
BioMed Central academic journals
Publications established in 1982
English-language journals
Creative Commons Attribution-licensed journals